The Downham Estate is a London County Council cottage estate in Downham, south east London. It is mainly in the London Borough of Lewisham and partly in the London Borough of Bromley.

The Downham Estate provides an example of the programme of building council housing occurring in Britain between the First and Second World Wars. The estate was constructed between 1924 and 1930 to plans by the LCC architect George Topham Forrest. One of the first houses to be completed was ceremonially opened in 1927 by King George V.

Among other similar developments around London (for example Becontree), it was developed to help alleviate the chronic shortage of housing in London, partly brought about by the complete cessation of building during World War I. It was intended to show what could be achieved by public-sector house-building: particularly in order to provide better housing for those who had lived in the slums of the city. The building of the Estate attracted subsidies from central government and was constructed under the auspices of the London County Council.

The estate covered an area of 522 acres (2.1 km2), of which 461 acres (1.9 km2) were in the Metropolitan Borough of Lewisham, (from 1965 the London Borough of Lewisham) and 61 acres (0.2 km2) in the Municipal Borough of Bromley (from 1965 the London Borough of Bromley); altogether it covered a distance of 1.25 miles (2 km). The land had previously been mainly rural although around Grove Park railway station in the east of the area there had been some development; between Lewisham and Bromley was virtually the end of London at that time. 5659 houses were constructed of varying sizes; and there were also 408 flats (apartments) in blocks up to four storeys in height.

Downham was named in honour of Lord Downham, who was chairman of the London County Council during 1919–20. The first tenants of the estate were mainly former residents of inner city areas, such as Rotherhithe and the accommodation was spacious and luxurious compared with their former dwellings.

References

 

Housing estates in London
Buildings and structures in the London Borough of Lewisham
Buildings and structures in the London Borough of Bromley
Districts of the London Borough of Lewisham
Districts of the London Borough of Bromley
Public housing in the United Kingdom